John Allan Yarmuth (born November 4, 1947) is a retired American politician and former newspaper editor who served as the U.S. representative for  from 2007 to 2023. His district encompassed the vast majority of the Louisville Metro Area. From 2013 onward, he had been the sole Democratic member of Kentucky's congressional delegation. Yarmuth chaired the House Budget Committee from 2019-2023. On October 12, 2021, he announced that he would not seek reelection in 2022.

Early life and education
Yarmuth was born in Louisville, Kentucky, the son of Edna E. (née Klein) and Stanley R. Yarmuth. He is descended from Jewish immigrants from Russia and Austria. He graduated from Atherton High School. He later graduated from Yale University, majoring in American studies.

Early career 
Yarmuth worked as a legislative aide for Republican U.S. Senator Marlow Cook from 1971 to 1974, then returned to Louisville and launched his publishing career by founding Louisville Today magazine, which operated from 1976 to 1982. He later worked as a vice president of University Relations at the University of Louisville from 1983 to 1986, where he was inducted into Omicron Delta Kappa as an honoris causa initiate in 2014. 

Yarmuth described himself as a Rockefeller Republican in his earlier years. He left the party during Ronald Reagan's presidency, saying, "I saw this unmistakable move away from moderation when he started hosting Jerry Falwell and Pat Robertson and catering to the religious right".

In 1990, Yarmuth founded the Louisville Eccentric Observer (LEO), a weekly newspaper for which he wrote a generally liberal political column that usually ran on page one. In 2003, he sold LEO to a company owned by Times Publishing Company of Pennsylvania, owner of the Erie Times-News. Yarmuth remained on board as a columnist and consultant until January 2006, when he put his column on hiatus to run for Congress.

U.S. House of Representatives

Elections

2006

On January 31, 2006, Yarmuth filed candidacy papers to represent . He won the Democratic primary on May 16, defeating Andrew Horne, Burrell Charles Farnsley and James W. Moore, and defeated incumbent Anne Northup in the November general election.

On August 7, 2006, The Courier-Journal reported that The Hill revealed a week before that the Democratic Congressional Campaign Committee had earmarked $51.5 million for television advertising in 32 congressional districts across the nation, but none for Yarmuth's challenge in the third congressional district.

On October 20, a Courier-Journal article stated that a WHAS11/SurveyUSA poll revealed the race had tightened dramatically, with Yarmuth leading Northup 48% to 47%. Another poll a month earlier had Northup leading by 6 points. A WHAS11/SurveyUSA poll released on November 2 showed Yarmuth leading Northup 52% to 44%.

On October 26, Yarmuth told Courier-Journal reporter Kay Stewart that he would donate his congressional salary—which would be $168,500 in 2007—to local charity.

Because polls close early in Kentucky, many analysts saw this race as a key indicator and it immediately became one of the most watched House races in the nation. Yarmuth received 122,139 votes (51%) to Northup's 116,157 (48%). Independent candidates garnered 2,896 (1%).

2008

Yarmuth ran unopposed in the primary, and faced Northup again in the general election. He won with 59% of the vote.

2010

Yarmuth was challenged by Republican Todd Lally and Independent Michael D. Hansen. He was reelected with 53% of the vote.

2012

Yarmuth was challenged by Republican Brooks Wicker and Independent candidate Robert L. Devore Jr. Yarmuth received 206,385 votes (63.96%) to Wicker's 111,452 (23.32%) and Devore's 4,819 (1.49%).

2014

In the 2014 general election, Yarmuth was challenged by Republican Michael McFarlane and Independent Gregory Puccetti. On October 6, 2014, Kentucky Educational Television hosted a debate that was broadcast live on Louisville's KET, and was moderated by KET host Bill Goodman. Yarmuth was reelected with 63.5% of the vote.

2016

Yarmuth was challenged by Republican Harold Bratcher and Independent Everett Corley. He won with 212,388 votes (63%) of the vote to Bratcher's 122,085 (37%). Corley received no votes.

2018

On April 17, 2017, Yarmuth announced that his candidacy for reelection in the 2018 election. During the campaign, he lobbied for the chairship of the House Budget Committee and promised to hold hearings on Medicare for all. Yarmuth was reelected with over 62% of the vote against Vickie Yates Glisson, Kentucky's former Secretary of Health and Family Services. After the Democrats took the House, Yarmuth became Budget Committee chair. In that position, he requested documents pertaining to the withholding of appropriated defense funds to Ukraine.

2020 

Yarmuth was reelected to an eighth and final term with 62% of vote against Republican Rhonda Palazzo.

Tenure

Yarmuth took office on January 3, 2007.

After his first year in Congress, Yarmuth donated his post-tax congressional salary of just over $120,000 to various Louisville charities.

On February 8, 2008, Yarmuth endorsed Barack Obama for the Democratic nomination for President of the United States.

On September 29, 2008, Yarmuth voted against the TARP bailout plan, as negotiated by House Speaker Nancy Pelosi, Senate Majority Leader Harry Reid, President George W. Bush, House Minority Leader John Boehner, and Senate Minority Leader Mitch McConnell. He voted for the second version of the bailout bill.

Yarmuth said he was so "nauseated" by a moment of silence for Michael Jackson on the House floor that he left the chamber. "I thought it was outrageous," he said. "In my two and a half years, we've not done this for anybody else. We've done it for former members and that's about it."

After winning a 2008 rematch with Anne Northup, his 2006 general election opponent, Yarmuth was rewarded by the Democratic Steering and Policy Committee with a spot on the influential Ways and Means Committee. On the committee, he worked on issues on which he campaigned before the 2008 election: Social Security, pension, Medicare, and Medicaid issues.

At a September 2009 town hall meeting, constituents were unhappy with Yarmuth's decision to support the Patient Protection and Affordable Care Act. "Yarmuth stayed calm in the face of boos and catcalls from some in the audience" according to an Associated Press report. "He warned that the current health care system is an unsustainable drain on businesses and the nation's economy."

In 2011, Yarmuth and Walter Jones introduced a bill to overturn key parts of the controversial court case Citizens United v. FEC. The legislation would also give Congress the power to enact mandatory public financing for Congressional candidates and create a national holiday for voting purposes.

In 2011, Yarmuth voted against the National Defense Authorization Act for Fiscal Year 2012 due to a controversial provision that allows the government and the military to indefinitely detain American citizens and others without trial.

In 2013, Yarmuth introduced the Fair Elections Now Act, which would establish a public financing system for Congressional campaigns.

In 2015, Yarmuth once again made an attempt at removing "dark money" from the political sphere by proposing HR 2125, the Keeping our Campaigns Honest Act of 2015.

Yarmuth signed onto a "Medicare for All" bill along with 120 other House Democrats in 2018, supporting single-payer healthcare.

Yarmuth was the only Kentuckian member of the Congressional Progressive Caucus.

On December 18, 2019, Yarmuth voted for both articles of impeachment against President Donald Trump, the only House member from Kentucky to do so.

For his tenure as the chairman of the House Budget Committee in the 116th Congress, Yarmuth earned an "A" grade from the nonpartisan Lugar Center's Congressional Oversight Hearing Index.

In 2021, Yarmuth introduced to the House the American Rescue Plan Act of 2021, President Joe Biden's first major piece of legislation.

On October 12, 2021, Yarmuth announced that he will retire from Congress at the end of his term in 2023.

Committee assignments
 Committee on the Budget (chair)
Committee on Education and Labor

Party leadership
 Regional Whip

Caucus memberships
Yarmuth's caucus memberships include:

Electoral history

Television
In 2003, Yarmuth and former WHAS-AM radio talk show host John Ziegler debated political issues on the weekly WAVE program Yarmuth & Ziegler, with Yarmuth taking the liberal side and Ziegler the conservative side. On a successor program, Hot Button, which ran from September 2004 to December 2005, he faced off with conservative Jim Milliman.

Yarmuth appeared on the March 8, 2007, episode of The Colbert Report in the show's "Better Know a District" series. In a parody of Yarmuth's former Yarmuth & Ziegler debate series, host Stephen Colbert prodded Yarmuth into a point/counterpoint style debate. After agreeing to the "debate," Colbert forced Yarmuth to defend the shredding of kittens in wood chippers, which Yarmuth gamely proceeded to do. Colbert called Yarmuth a real-life Bruce Wayne, and presented him with a framed print of his congressional photo with a Batman mask photoshopped over his face.

Personal life
Yarmuth has served on many boards, including the Bingham Child Guidance Center and Kentucky Country Day School. He is Kentucky's first Jewish congressman. Yarmuth and his wife, Cathy Yarmuth, have one son, Aaron, who is a graduate of Kentucky Country Day. Aaron was the owner of the Louisville Eccentric Observer, and along with a group of local investors purchased the publication in 2012. In May 2021 it was sold to the Euclid Media Group.

See also

 List of Jewish members of the United States Congress

References

External links

 

|-

|-

|-

1947 births
20th-century American newspaper publishers (people)
20th-century American Jews
21st-century American newspaper publishers (people)
21st-century American Jews
21st-century American politicians
American columnists
American Jews from Kentucky
American magazine founders
American magazine publishers (people)
American newspaper founders
American people of Austrian-Jewish descent
American people of Russian-Jewish descent
Atherton High School alumni
Democratic Party members of the United States House of Representatives from Kentucky
Editors of Kentucky newspapers
Jewish members of the United States House of Representatives
Living people
Politicians from Louisville, Kentucky
School board members in Kentucky
Yale College alumni